Geigant station is a railway station in the Geigant district in the municipality of Waldmünchen, located in the Cham district in Bavaria, Germany.

References

External links
 

Railway stations in Bavaria
Buildings and structures in Cham (district)